United States Army Counterintelligence (ACI) is the component of United States Army Military Intelligence which conducts counterintelligence activities to detect, identify, assess, counter, exploit and/or neutralize adversarial, foreign intelligence services, international terrorist organizations, and insider threats to the United States Army and U.S. Department of Defense (DoD).

Overview
ACI is one of only three DoD Counterintelligence (CI) entities designated by the Office of the Under Secretary of Defense for Intelligence and Security, as a "Military Department CI Organization" or "MDCO." The other two DoD MDCO's are the Department of the Air Force Office of Special Investigations (OSI) and the Naval Criminal Investigative Service (NCIS). As an MDCO, Special Agents of ACI are recognized federal law enforcement officers tasked with conducting criminal CI investigations in conjunction with other CI activities. Other CI entities within the DoD not recognized as MDCOs, such as Marine Corps Counterintelligence and the Defense Counterintelligence and Security Agency (DCSA) have no direct criminal investigative mission and therefore are designated only as "intelligence" or "security" organizations; although they may assist in such investigations in a non-law enforcement capacity as authorized by Executive Order 12333 and applicable regulations.

ACI Special Agents are U.S. Army personnel, either military or civilian, who are trained and appointed to conduct CI investigations and operations for the U.S. Army and DoD. As federal law enforcement officers who are issued badge and credentials, they have apprehension authority and jurisdiction in the investigation of national security crimes committed by Army personnel including treason, spying, espionage, sedition, subversion, sabotage or assassination directed by foreign governments/actors, and support to international terrorism. They do not have jurisdiction over general criminal matters, which are investigated by the United States Army Criminal Investigation Command (CID). In other branches of the U.S. military, both general criminal and counterintelligence investigations are performed by the same entity, as seen with AFOSI and NCIS who are also identified as "Defense Criminal Investigative Organizations." The Army continues to keep these investigative activities separate via ACI and CID, although parallel and joint investigations happen periodically between these two U.S. Army agencies.

Most operational ACI Special Agents today work under the auspices of the United States Army Intelligence and Security Command (INSCOM) with the US Army Counterintelligence Command (USACIC) responsible for CI activities and operating field offices within the continental United States.  Outside the continental U.S., the 500th Military Intelligence Brigade provides the same type of support in Hawaii and Japan, the 501st Military Intelligence Brigade supports South Korea, and the 66th Military Intelligence Brigade does so in Europe. The 470th Military Intelligence Brigade covers South America, the 513th Military Intelligence Brigade covers the greater Middle East, and the 650th Military Intelligence Group covers NATO missions in applicable countries. Other U.S. Army elements also have CI agents assigned to provide direct support such as those found within the various elements of Special Operations.

History
Prior to World War I, the U.S. military had no standing counterintelligence services, requiring the use of other elements to conduct counterintelligence activities, such as the Culper Spy Ring during the American Revolution, and by Allan Pinkerton and his private detectives during the U.S. Civil War.

ACI was formed as a standing CI service in 1917 during World War I, as the Corps of Intelligence Police under the newly created Military Intelligence Division commanded by Colonel Ralph Van Deman. Later, it was renamed and reformed as the  Counter Intelligence Corps (CIC) during World War II and the Cold War. In the early 1970's, following the disbanding of the CIC, ACI was completely restructured as a result of intelligence reform. ACI agents were placed under the control of different military intelligence organizations that followed into the present day under INSCOM.

Special Agent duties
ACI Special Agent duties include the investigation of national security crimes using special investigative procedures, conducting counterintelligence operations, processing intelligence evidence, conducting both surveillance and counter-surveillance activities, protecting sensitive technologies, preparing and distributing reports, conducting source/informant operations, debriefing personnel for counterintelligence collections, and supporting counter-terrorism operations.

Senior ACI Special Agents provide guidance to junior Special Agents and supervise their training; conduct liaison and operational coordination with foreign and U.S. law enforcement, security, and intelligence agencies; plan and conduct counterintelligence operations/activities related to national security; conduct high-profile counterintelligence collection activities and source operations ranging from overt to clandestine collection; supervise/manage surveillance operations; provide support for counterintelligence analytical products, to include preparing counterintelligence reports, estimates, and vulnerability assessments; and with additional training, may conduct technical surveillance countermeasures (TSCM), credibility assessment examinations, or exploit cyber threats. Some ACI Special Agents are also cross-sworn and assigned to various federal task forces, such as the FBI Joint Terrorism Task Force in regions of the U.S. where the U.S. Army or DoD has significant assets to protect against terrorist threats.

Senior ACI Special Agents are also often assigned to U.S. Army Special Forces groups to assist with liaison, source operations, and intelligence investigations (typically in support of force protection); while also working closely with other intelligence collectors. These "Special Operations Forces (SOF)" CI Agents are granted the Enlisted Special Qualification Identifier (SQI) "S" or Officer Skill Code "K9" after successfully graduating from Airborne School, and after they have spent 12–24 months with a SOF unit; which may also require Agents complete additional unit level training and/or: Ranger School, SERE School, or applicable JSOU courses.

While conducting operations in tactical environments, Army CI/HUMINT personnel often work in small teams called HUMINT Exploitation Teams (HET). HET's are designed to not only collect and report HUMINT information but to also exploit that intelligence information by acting on it. HET's also conduct Counterintelligence activities designed to deny, detect and deceive the enemy's ability to target friendly forces.

Like their CID counterparts, ACI special agents are covered by the Law Enforcement Officers Safety Act (LEOSA), and may apply for LEOSA credentials to carry a personal concealed firearm in any jurisdiction in the United States or United States Territories, regardless of state or local laws, with certain exceptions.

Functions of Counterintelligence
Military and Civilian US Army Counterintelligence (CI) Special Agents receive their badge and credentials after graduation from the US Army CI Special Agent course in Fort Huachuca, Arizona.  At his time, Army CI Special Agents are authorized, but not required, to attend the Federal Law Enforcement Training Center's (FLETC) Criminal Investigator Training Program (CITP) to function in most duty positions, with the exception of those agents assigned to FBI Joint Terrorism Task Forces (JTTF).

Unlike the Naval Criminal Investigative Service (NCIS) and Office of Special Investigations (OSI), the Army separates their criminal investigators into two separate components known as United States Army Criminal Investigation Division (CID) and Army Counterintelligence. Army CID is responsible for investigating the more traditional range of criminal activity that most people would associate with the job of a Special Agent. On the other hand, Army CI is responsible for criminal investigations related to National Security Crimes like espionage, terrorism, sabotage, subversion, sedition, and treason.

The United States Coast Guard made the same decision when they established the Coast Guard Counterintelligence Service (CGCIS).  The civilian counterparts for Army CID are classified as 1811's, however the civilian counterparts for Army CI are classified as 0132's who are predominately employed under the Military Intelligence Civilian Excepted Career Program (MICECP).

Investigations

Investigation of National Security Crimes.

Investigating the defection of Military personnel and DA Civilians overseas.

Security Violations.

Investigations involving AWOL/deserters and suicides involving someone with access to classified material.

Operations

CI Special Operations/National Foreign Counterintelligence Program.

Offensive Counterintelligence Programs.

CI Support to Force Protection.

Collection

Intelligence collection related to foreign intelligence service activities.

Intelligence collection related to national security crimes.

Write intelligence information reports.

Intelligence debriefings.

Analysis and Production

CI analysis focusing on foreign intelligence and insider threat.

CI threat and vulnerability assessments.

CI studies of foreign intelligence services and insider threat.

Functional Services

CI Polygraph Program.

Technical Surveillance Countermeasures (TSCM).

Special Agent occupational codes
Counterintelligence Special Agent Military Occupational Specialty (MOS) codes include:

The Army is planning to re-designate civilian agents from 0132 to a new 1800 series federal job code. The date for this change has not yet been determined.

Selection and initial training

Department of the Army Pamphlet 611-21 requires applicants for Counterintelligence be able to:

 Obtain a Top Secret security clearance with Sensitive Compartmented Information eligibility.
 A physical profile (PULHES) of 222221 or better.
 Be a minimum age of 21 after training for accreditation as a Special Agent.
 Be a minimum rank of E5/Sergeant after training for accreditation as a Special Agent.
 Possess an occupational specialty with a physical demands rating of medium.
 Have normal color vision.
 Have a minimum score of 101 in aptitude area ST on ASVAB tests administered on or after July 1, 2004.
 Be a high school graduate or equivalent.
 Possess good voice quality and be able to speak English without an objectionable accent or impediment.
 Never been a member of the U.S. Peace Corps.
 No adverse information in military personnel, Provost Marshal, intelligence, or medical records which would prevent receiving a security clearance under AR 380-67 including no record of conviction by court-martial, or by a civilian court for any offense other than minor traffic violations.
 Must be interviewed per DA Pam 600-8, procedure 3-33 by a qualified Counterintelligence Special Agent.
 Must be a U.S. citizen.
 Must receive a command level recommendation for initial appointment.
 Must not have immediate family members or immediate family members of the Soldier's spouse who reside in a country within whose boundaries physical or mental coercion is known to be common practice.
 Have neither commercial nor vested interest in a country within whose boundaries physical or mental coercion is known to be a common practice against persons acting in the interest of the U.S.
 Must receive a waiver for any immediate family members who are not U.S. citizens.

This occupation has recently been made an entry level Army position, though many applicants are still drawn from the existing ranks. Becoming a credentialed Counterintelligence Special Agent requires successful completion of the Counterintelligence Special Agent Course (CISAC) at either Fort Huachuca, Arizona, or Camp Williams, Utah. Newly trained special agents are placed on a probationary status for the first year after graduation for active duty agents, and for the first two years after graduation for reserve/national guard agents. This allows for the removal of the Counterintelligence Special Agent MOS if the probationary Agent is deemed unfit for duty as a Special Agent.

Additional and advanced training

 Joint Counterintelligence Training Academy (JCITA): at Quantico, VA has numerous classified specialty and advanced counterintelligence courses for Special Agents of U.S. Army Counterintelligence, NCIS, OSI, and other agencies.
 Defense Cyber Investigations Training Academy (DCITA): as with numerous other law enforcement and intelligence agencies, DCITA also trains U.S. Army Counterintelligence Special Agents to be cyber criminal investigators and computer forensic specialists to support various counterintelligence investigations, operations, and collections.
 Federal Law Enforcement Training Center (FLETC): As of 2017, U.S. Army Counterintelligence is an official partner organization with FLETC and began regularly sending agents through the Criminal Investigator Training Program (CITP), the same course attended by numerous other U.S. Federal Law Enforcement Agencies.
 Joint Special Operations University (JSOU): As with other special operations support occupations, Counterintelligence Special Agents assigned to special operations units have the opportunity to attend several courses through JSOU located near US SOCOM Headquarters at MacDill Air Force Base.

Uniform and firearms
ACI Active duty Special Agents within the United States are authorized to wear civilian business attire and carry firearms in the performance of their investigative duties. In tactical and combat environments, they are authorized to wear the Army Combat Uniform, tactical civilian attire, or attire that supports the operational security of their mission.  When agents wear the Army Combat Uniform they are authorized to replace rank insignia with Department of the Army Civilian "U.S." insignia.  Given the broad range of CI activities, specific assignments will dictate what clothing is appropriate, which may be civilian attire local to the area of operation.  Although agents may be issued other weapons on special assignments, they are generally assigned a standard Sig Sauer M18 compact pistol. For combat environments, special agents are also typically issued the M4 carbine.

Notable U.S. Army Counterintelligence Special Agents

 Noel Behn
 Philip J. Corso
 Luis Elizondo
 Jim Gilmore
 Mike Gravel
 Clinton J. Hill
 Henry Kissinger
 Arthur Komori
 Ann M. McDonough
 Edward T. McHale  
 Ib Melchior
 Nathan Safferstein
 Richard M. Sakakida
 J. D. Salinger
 Isadore Zack

In films and television
 The 1988 movie Hotel Terminus, is a documentary which chronicles the life of former German SS Officer Klaus Barbie, and partially depicts his time working for CIC after World War II.
 In the popular 1986-87 comic book series Watchmen and its later film adaptation, a character named Forbes is an Agent of U.S. Army Intelligence.
 In the 1981 George Lucas and Steven Spielberg movie Raiders of the Lost Ark starring Harrison Ford, Indiana Jones and his friend Marcus are briefed and sent on a mission by two CIP Special Agents to locate and recover the lost Ark of the Covenant before the Nazis can find it.
 In the 1975 movie The Imposter, an ex-Army intelligence agent is hired to impersonate a rich builder who has been marked for assassination.
 From 1973 to 1979, the television show MASH featured a recurring character named Colonel Samuel Flagg, who was likely a current or former CIC Agent.
 The 1972 TV movie Fireball Forward featured Ben Gazzara as a general placed in command of a "bad luck" division.  He quickly determines there is a spy in the unit, giving the Germans the division plans just before each battle, resulting in defeat after defeat.  The general contacts CIC major L.Q. Jones, who assigns CIC undercover agent Morgan Paull.  The agent eventually finds the spy.  This movie was a pilot for a series that was never made.
 In a 1965 episode of the television show The Lucy Show, starring Lucille Ball, titled, Lucy and the Undercover Agent, Lucy becomes convinced a mysterious person at a restaurant is an enemy spy when, in fact, he is an Army CI Agent who thinks Lucy is a spy.

See also

Other Military Department Counterintelligence Organizations
 Naval Criminal Investigative Service (NCIS)
 Air Force Office of Special Investigations (AFOSI or OSI)

Additional Defense Criminal Investigative Organizations
 United States Army Criminal Investigation Command (CID)
 Defense Criminal Investigative Service (DCIS)

Additional Department of Defense Counterintelligence Entities (Non-Law Enforcement)
 Defense Intelligence Agency (DIA)
 Defense Counterintelligence and Security Agency (DCSA)
 Marine Corps Counterintelligence

Non-DoD Federal Counterintelligence Investigative Organizations
 Federal Bureau of Investigation (FBI)
 Diplomatic Security Service (DSS)
 Coast Guard Counterintelligence Service (CGCIS)

Additional Information
 Federal law enforcement in the United States
 U.S. Army Special Forces
 List of United States Army MOS
 Historical U.S. Army Counterintelligence Corps
 Historical U.S. Army Corps of Intelligence Police

References

External links
 Military Intelligence Civilian Excepted Career Program (MICECP)
 GoArmy.com > Careers & Jobs > Counterintelligence Agent (35L)
 MOS Change
 MOSs on the move 

Military intelligence
Organizations based in Virginia
Government agencies established in 1977
Counterintelligence agencies